Douglas fir and aspen forest is a plant community or vegetation type of the mountains of the western United States, dominated by Douglas fir (Pseudotsuga menziesii) and Quaking aspen (Populus tremuloides).

References

Pseudotsuga
Forests of the Rocky Mountains